Call of Duty: World at War – Zombies (also known as simply Call of Duty: Zombies) is a first-person shooter video game developed by Ideaworks Game Studio, and published by Activision for iOS. It is a spin-off of the Call of Duty series, and based on the Zombies mode of Call of Duty: World at War.  The game was released worldwide on November 16, 2009.  The game allows for multiplayer cooperative gameplay locally via an ad hoc Wi-Fi or Bluetooth network, or globally via the internet. It also comes with the three other maps, Verrückt, Shi No Numa, and Der Riese. A sequel to the game, Call of Duty: Black Ops – Zombies has been published by Activision.

The game's setting originally takes place in a German bunker (Nacht der Untoten) during World War II from the viewpoint of a US Marine. SS soldiers who have become zombies attempt to infiltrate the bunker and attack the players, and the players must defend themselves in the process.

Gameplay 
The objective of the game is to survive each round of invading zombies after which a more difficult round begins. The player begins the game with a Colt 1911 and has access to a melee attack via a combat knife, as well as a maximum of 4 hand grenades. As players fight the zombies, they receive points. These points are used to buy weapons, perks, and access to different parts of the map. Some maps have different variations of zombies that spawn on specific waves, like zombie hell hounds.

Zombies enter from outside the playable map via barricaded entries. As the rounds progress, difficulty increases and the zombies can remove barricades faster. Players are awarded points for replacing barricades as well as killing zombies.

The game has a variety of perks that can be bought with points which award players with enhanced abilities. In addition to perks, there are random instances of power-up drops that are left behind when a zombie is killed to further aid players.

Some maps may also contain 'Easter Eggs' that players can perform to play music, earn some kind of reward, or learn more about the series' cryptic lore.

References 

2009 video games
Activision games
Zombies
IOS games
Multiplayer and single-player video games
Video games about the United States Marine Corps
Video games developed in the United Kingdom
Video games about zombies
Video games set in Berlin
Video games set in Japan
Video games set in Europe
Video games set in Germany
Treyarch games
Video games developed in the United States